Walter Ladengast (4 July 1899 – 3 July 1980) was an Austrian film actor. He appeared in more than 70 films between 1928 and 1979, a majority silent. His film career momentarily suffered when it was discovered he was a Nazi Sympathizer.  

After the war, his film career picked up but he was given only supporting roles. 

He was born in Vienna, Austria and died in Munich, Germany, aged 80.

Filmography

References

External links

1899 births
1980 deaths
Austrian male film actors
Austrian male television actors
Male actors from Vienna
20th-century Austrian male actors